Yerikoppa is a village in the southern state of Karnataka, India. It is located in the Dharwad taluk of Dharwad district. Yerikoppa is  distance from its Taluk Main Town Dharwad. Yerikoppa is  distance from its District Main City Dharwad and  distance from its State Main City Bangalore.

Demographics
As of the 2011 Census of India there were 299 households in Yerikoppa and a total population of 1,541 consisting of 802 males and 739 females. There were 187 children ages 0–6.

See also
Districts of Karnataka

References

External links
http://Dharwad.nic.in/

Villages in Dharwad district